Alfena is a Portuguese city and parish in the municipality of Valongo, Portugal. The population in 2010 was 18,130, in an area of 15.7 km².

References

Freguesias of Valongo